"TV" is a song by American singer-songwriter Billie Eilish. It is part of her second extended play, Guitar Songs (2022), a two-track project that consists of two sentimental ballads with soft vocals over acoustic guitar. Eilish debuted the song during a Manchester live performance in June 2022 as part of a world tour in support of Happier Than Ever (2021), her second studio album; the crowd noises from the tour performance are sampled in the studio version of "TV".

The song discusses feelings of depression and abandonment, centered around watching television to numb oneself from the problems facing one's life. In addition, Eilish laments the public's fixation to the defamation trial between Johnny Depp and Amber Heard—she questions what she perceives as their lack of concern about the overturning of Roe v. Wade, which happened weeks after she finished writing the song, and the future of US abortion rights.

"TV" was released on July 21, 2022, and critics praised it primarily for its sociopolitical and self-reflective lyrics; some believed that the lyrics were a testament to Eilish's songwriting skills. The song reached the top 40 of singles charts in over 10 countries, including the United States, peaking at number 52 on the Billboard Hot 100 chart.

Background 
Billie Eilish released her second studio album Happier Than Ever on July 30, 2021. She started formulating ideas for her third studio album's songs with her brother, producer Finneas O'Connell, in December of that year. After writing "The 30th" on December 30, the two embarked on a 2022–2023 world tour in support of Happier Than Ever, which began on February 3, 2022. While on tour, Eilish allocated a certain period of time in her schedule for songwriting, during which she was busy writing "TV". She wrote the song with Finneas, who handled its production.

Songwriting for "TV" was concurrent with the US Supreme Court's discussion around the Dobbs v. Jackson Women's Health Organization case. The writing process took months: while the two were quick to finish the first verse, they penned the remaining lyrics only after a draft of the court decision was leaked online, in May 2022. The leaked draft revealed plans to overturn Roe v. Wade, a landmark case which had made abortion a constitutional right in the country. Eilish, known for her history with political activism, was saddened by the leak, and she felt like her rights as a woman were getting stripped away from her. Weeks after she and Finneas were done with the songwriting, the Supreme Court decided to overturn Roe v. Wade. Eilish bemoaned the decision, speaking in hindsight about writing the lyrics after the first verse: "It was a placeholder of doom."

By July 2022, "TV" and "The 30th" were the only songs that she and Finneas had made; they tried to entertain the idea of including them on her third album. She had shelved her voice memos for "TV" for several weeks, and upon stumbling across the recordings again, she wanted to share what the song's lyrics had to offer to her fans as soon as possible. Noting the immediacy of it and "The 30th", Eilish said: "These songs are really current for me, and they're songs that I want to have said right now." She decided to exclude "TV" from the third album's track list after a discussion with Finneas, despite announcing plans to start the corresponding recording sessions beforehand.

Music and lyrics 

"TV" is a ballad with a minimalist production that combines Eilish's soft vocals with an acoustic guitar. The song has a runtime of 4 minutes and 41 seconds. Its sound is intentionally reminiscent of Eilish and Finneas's oldest works, created when they wanted to write music at their parents' house with nothing but a guitar.

Music journalists were in agreement that "TV" was primarily driven by the lyricism and vocal performance. In a review for The Guardian, Laura Snapes wrote that immediacy and anxiety, demonstrated through Eilish's voice, were at the song's core. Its lyrics are about feelings of abandonment issues and a desire for numbness as a distraction from the problems that plague the world. It explores poignant subject matters like eating disorders, mental health, the defamation trial between actors Johnny Depp and Amber Heard, and the outcome of the Dobbs case.

The song opens by describing a depressive episode. Unable to sleep, she distracts herself from a falling-out with an ex-partner by watching the reality TV show Survivor, then she expresses cynicism towards other people and their motivations. Eilish sings about "sinking in the sofa while we all betray each other", posing the question "what’s the point of anything?" Jon Pareles of The New York Times interpreted the scene as a demonstration of "the ways entertainment nurtures distraction, alienation and apathy". In the chorus, Eilish discusses the effects of her romantic relationships on the amount of time she can spend with her friends.

By the second verse, Eilish ponders how her friendships have also been affected by her celebrity status and tries to restrain herself from skipping meals. Next, she laments how "the internet's gone wild watching movie stars on trial / While they're overturning Roe v. Wade." Eilish expressed anger about the situation in the NME cover story, questioning why the public prioritized fixating on the feud between Depp and Heard, which she found trivial, instead of showing concern about the future of abortion rights. The chorus reappears after the second verse, and to close the song, Eilish uses a refrain. She repeats the phrase "maybe I'm the problem", blaming herself for the life issues she has faced while writing "TV".

Release 

Guitar Songs is Eilish's second extended play (EP), and Darkroom and Interscope Records released it without prior warning on July 21, 2022. The EP consists of "TV" and "The 30th", tallying two songs for the track list. Having grown tired of traditional promotion for upcoming music, Eilish wanted to put out songs like she had been doing early in her career, previewing them for fans in live concerts before releasing them without much marketing.

Upon the EP's release, "TV" charted in multiple territories. In the US, it debuted at number 52 on the Billboard Hot 100 and at number 7 on Hot Rock & Alternative Songs. Elsewhere, it reached the top 40 of charts in Japan, Ireland, Malaysia, New Zealand, Greece, Sweden, Australia, the UK, Lithuania, Canada, Norway, and Switzerland. In terms of international commercial performance, the song entered the Billboard Global 200 at number 25.

Critical reception 
Critics applauded Eilish for her self-reflection and social commentary in "TV", and some considered its lyricism as a testament to her writing talent. They wrote that she managed to create an effectively tragic story in the song, use narrative details with "great subtlety", and discuss poignant themes without downplaying their seriousness, leading Snapes to describe the song's writing style as realist. Alexis Petridis, a music journalist for The Guardian, praised the melancholic tone of "TV", which prompted him to select it as the best song performed during the tour's Manchester concert. Entertainment columnists for the Manila Bulletin argued that the confessional and sociopolitical nature of the lyrics, elements they associated with all the greatest songwriters before her, served as "a reminder that 20-year-old Eilish remains one of the most treasured singer-songwriters of her generation". 

Praise was also directed towards Eilish's voice and the production choices for the song. One critic from Nylon deemed her vocals "powerful", and another from Billboard sensed improvement in her vocal technique and called her voice "increasingly confident". Snapes liked that Eilish's vocals and the chord progression were, to her, appropriate for the song's tone: "Fittingly, the melody of each line seems to tumble, each one a crumbling empire delivered in her tremulous, feather-light voice." Other music journalists appreciated the acoustic musical style, and they found the guitar subtle and relaxing in nature. An unknown NME author wrote: "She sings over lulling acoustic guitars meant to soothe the most disillusioned of us." Ranking it as one of the best songs of 2022, two critics for the British edition of GQ called "TV" a "devastating stunner", citing its use of the "spine-chilling" audience sample.

Live performances 

On June 7, 2022, during the Manchester concert of the Happier Than Ever world tour, Eilish debuted "TV" via a live performance with Finneas, who provided acoustic guitar instrumentation. This marked the first time since around 2017 that Eilish gave a preview of an unreleased song. Explaining the decision, she stated in an NME cover story that she had "missed doing a song that no-one had heard yet" during concert tours from those years.

In an Apple Music 1 interview, Eilish said that the debut performance made her feel vulnerable, mainly because the song's subject matter was sensitive to her, but also because she considered the act of performing an unreleased song emotionally striking. She told the interviewer Zane Lowe that she was inspired to do it after seeing Harry Styles play another unreleased song, "Boyfriends", at the music festival Coachella. "TV" became a favorite among fans after they heard the preview—its studio version includes a sample of a cheering crowd from the tour performance.

Nine days after the release of Guitar Songs, Eilish and Finneas visited the Amoeba Music record store in Hollywood to play "TV", along with three other songs, in commemoration of Happier Than Ever one-year anniversary. The two continued to perform "TV" during the world tour, including it in the set list of the Singapore stop. They collaborated with the country's tourism board after the tour's Asian leg to film a live performance of "TV", set at the Gardens by the Bay. She shared the video to her YouTube account on September 21, 2022.

Personnel 

Credits adapted from Tidal.

 Billie Eilishvocals, songwriting, engineering, vocal editing
 Finneas O'Connellsongwriting, production, engineering, vocal editing, bass, drums, guitar, piano, programming, synthesizer
 Dave Kutchmastering
 Rob Kinelskimixing
 Eli Heislerassistant mixing

Charts

Weekly charts

Year-end charts

Certification

References

Notes

Sources 

2020s ballads
2022 songs
Billie Eilish songs
Song recordings produced by Finneas O'Connell
Songs about television
Songs written by Billie Eilish
Songs written by Finneas O'Connell